Hinter den sieben Gleisen is a 1959 Swiss comedy film written and directed by .

Cast 
 Hannes Schmidhauser - Hartmann
 Ursula Heyer - Inge Bögner
 Zarli Carigiet - Dürst
 Ruedi Walter - Clown
 Max Haufler - Barbarossa
 Margrit Rainer - Frau Herzog
 Helmut Förnbacher - Paul Eberhardt
 César Keiser - Sänger
 Ettore Cella - Colonna

References

External links 

1959 comedy films
1959 films
Swiss comedy films
Swiss German-language films
Films directed by Kurt Früh
Swiss black-and-white films